Wikipedia: The Missing Manual is a 2008 book by John Broughton. It is a how-to guide that explains the process of contributing to the Wikipedia online encyclopedia.

"For anyone who is interested in becoming part of the noble experiment, this book is an excellent introduction," wrote reviewer Robert Slade. Wikipedia: The Missing Manual  is part of O'Reilly Media's Missing Manual series, which was created by David Pogue, technology columnist for The New York Times and Scientific American.

On January 26, 2009, O'Reilly announced that the content of the book was being released under a free license compatible with Wikipedia and that it would be available for editing in the Help area of Wikipedia.

The book has a spin-off, Wikipedia Reader's Guide: The Missing Manual, consisting of Appendix B (slightly expanded) and Chapter 1 from the book.

Publications

See also
 Help: Wikipedia: The Missing Manual: Text as incorporated into Wikipedia's help pages
 How Wikipedia Works
 Bibliography of Wikipedia
 State Library of Queensland's Exploring Wikipedia Content Creation Training Manual at Wikimedia Commons

References

External links
 
 Wikipedia: The Missing Manual at O'Reilly Media.
 

Handbooks and manuals
2008 non-fiction books
Books about Wikipedia
Wikipedia: The Missing Manual
O'Reilly Media books